Viva Elvis is the soundtrack remix album of the Cirque du Soleil show Viva Elvis, which focuses on the life and music of American singer and musician Elvis Presley. The album, though initially produced as a soundtrack to the show, does not include all of the songs featured in the show. The CD tracks are rearranged and extended versions of songs heard in the show, and in fact the album includes two instrumental versions of the songs "Memories" and "You'll Never Walk Alone", neither of which is in the Cirque du Soleil show.

This album marks the third official posthumous album by Elvis Presley created from scratch, whereas previous albums were compilations of previously released or unreleased studio material recorded well before his death. The two prior albums were the urban country-influenced 1981 Guitar Man record and the 2008 Christmas Duets CD. Similar to Cirque du Soleil's soundtrack to the Beatles-themed Love, "Viva Elvis" contains samples from throughout the entire span of Elvis Presley's career, including interview clips, home recordings, studio outtakes and snippets of dialogue from Elvis's feature films.

Unlike Love, however, Viva Elvis features new backing instrumentation on each track in an attempt to modernize the arrangements. This has met with a mixed critical response, with some reviewers praising the production quality and others opining that Elvis's music is best left untampered with.

Track listing

Bonus tracks

In each country, a bonus version of "Love Me Tender" was included, featuring a local singer in place of the singer from the Cirque du Soleil show.

Finland - Anna Puu
Netherlands - Lisa Lois
France - Amel Bent
Spain - Russian Red
America and Wal-Mart Exclusive in United States - Thalía
Australia - Jessica Mauboy
Belgium - Dani Klein
Canada - Marie-Mai
Portugal - Aurea
Japan - Miho Fukuhara

Personnel
Vocals - Elvis Presley
Guest singers - Dea Norberg ("Love Me Tender"), Jennlee Shallow ("King Creole"), Sherry St-Germain ("Can't Help Falling In Love"), Stacie Tabb ("Suspicious Minds")
Drums - Ben Clement
Bass - Patrick Levergne
Electric guitars - JS "The Flash" Chouinard, Mike Plant, Steve Nadeau, Martin Bachand, Paul Deslauriers, Erich van Tourneau
Acoustic guitars - Olivier Goulet, Erich van Tourneau
Piano and keyboards: Erich van Tourneau
Harmonica - Guy Belanger
Scratch - DJ Pocket
Brass section - Jean-Francois Thibeault (T-Bone), Brune Dumont (Sax), David Perrico (Trumpet), Jean-Francois Gagnon (Flugel)

Production
Producer and arranger: Eric van Tourneau
Assistant producer and assistant arranger: Hugo "Wedge Montecristo" Bombardier
Executive producers: Steve Berkowitz, Adam Block, Stephanie Mongeau, Jacques Methe, Stephane Bergevin, Gary Hovey and Priscilla Presley

Chart performance

Certifications and sales

See also
 Cirque du Soleil
 Viva Elvis
 Cirque du Soleil discography
 ELVIS 2022 Soundtrack

References

External links
Allmusic.com review of the album
Official album website
Official Sony Legacy Elvis website

Elvis Presley soundtracks
2010 soundtrack albums
Cirque du Soleil albums
Legacy Recordings soundtracks
Theatre soundtracks
2010 remix albums
Legacy Recordings remix albums